Rockwall County is a county in the U.S. state of Texas. At 149 square miles, Rockwall County has the smallest area of any Texas county. Per the 2020 Census, its population was 107,819. Its county seat is Rockwall. The county and city are named for a wall-like subterranean rock formation that runs throughout the county.

Rockwall County is part of the Dallas-Fort Worth-Arlington metropolitan statistical area. It was one of the top 25 fastest-growing counties in the U.S. in 2010. Rockwall County is listed as the sixth-wealthiest county in Texas.

Cities in Rockwall county include Rockwall, Heath, Royse City, Fate, McClendon-Chisholm, Mobile City, and part of Rowlett.

History
Rockwall County was formed in 1873 from portions of Kaufman County. It split off because access to the county seat of Kaufman was inconvenient. It was named for its county seat, Rockwall.
Rockwall County also is home to the great rock wall, which is no longer in public view today.

Geography
It is the smallest county by area in Texas.

Major highways
  Interstate 30
  U.S. Highway 67
  State Highway 66
  State Highway 205
  State Highway 276

Adjacent counties
 Collin County (north)
 Hunt County (east)
 Kaufman County (south)
 Dallas County (west)

Communities

 Dallas (mostly in Dallas County with small parts in Collin, Denton, Kaufman and Rockwall counties)
 Fate
 Garland (mostly in Dallas County with a small part in Collin County)
 Heath (small part in Kaufman County)
 McLendon-Chisholm
 Mobile City
 Rockwall (county seat)
 Rowlett (mostly in Dallas County)
 Royse City (partly in Collin and Hunt counties)
 Wylie (mostly in Collin County and a small part in Dallas County)

Demographics

Note: the US Census treats Hispanic/Latino as an ethnic category. This table excludes Latinos from the racial categories and assigns them to a separate category. Hispanics/Latinos can be of any race.

According to the census of 2000, there were 43,080 people, 14,530 households, and 11,972 families residing in the county.  The population density was 334 people per square mile (129/km2).  There were 15,351 housing units at an average density of 119 per square mile (46/km2). The racial makeup of the county was 89.17% White, 3.24% Black or African American, 0.40% Native American, 1.32% Asian, 0.05% Pacific Islander, 4.45% from other races, and 1.37% from two or more races.  11.07% of the population were Hispanic or Latino of any race. By the 2020 census, its population increased to 107,819 with a racial and ethnic makeup of 65.11% non-Hispanic whites, 7.59% African Americans, 0.44% Native Americans, 3.07% Asians, 0.07% Pacific Islanders, 0.32% some other race, 4.34% multiracial, and 19.07% Hispanic or Latino of any race.

Education
The following school districts serve Rockwall County:
 Rockwall Independent School District (small portion in Kaufman County)
 Royse City Independent School District (small portion in Collin, Hunt counties)

From 1997 to 2015 the number of non-Hispanic white children in K-12 schools in the county increased by 6,000 as part of a trend of white flight and suburbanization by non-Hispanic white families.

Collin College's official service area includes all of Rockwall County.

Politics
Prior to 1972, Rockwall County was a Democratic stronghold. The 1968 election was highly transitional for the county with Hubert Humphrey only winning with 39% of the vote thanks to the strong third-party candidacy of George Wallace. From 1972 on, the county has become a Republican stronghold. George H. W. Bush in 1992 has been the only Republican to fail to win a majority in the county since then, as the strong third-party candidacy of Ross Perot that year led him to a second-place finish in the county over national winner Bill Clinton. However, the county was represented in Congress by a Democrat as late as January 2004, when Representative & Rockwall resident Ralph Hall, a conservative Democrat, switched parties and became a Republican.

However, in recent years, especially as the Dallas-Fort Worth Metro area continues to grow and spill over into neighboring counties, the county's Republican bent has lessened a bit. Native son George W. Bush registered 78% of the vote here in 2004, however, in 2020, Joe Biden turned in the showing for the Democrats since Jimmy Carter's 32.10% in 1980 by getting 30.45%, besting even Barack Obama's 2008 margin of 26.40% (one of several counties across the country where Biden did better than Obama), and also the first time Democrats have cracked 30% of the vote here since Carter's 1980 run. Donald Trump's 68.15% margin is the worst for Republicans since Bob Dole's 65.01% in 1996.

Local government 
Rockwall County is divided into four precincts, each represented by a County Commissioner.

As of the most recent elections in 2020, all four Commissioners are Republicans.

See also

 List of museums in North Texas
 National Register of Historic Places listings in Rockwall County, Texas
 Recorded Texas Historic Landmarks in Rockwall County
 Texas locations by per capita income

References

External links
 Rockwall County government's website
 

 
Dallas–Fort Worth metroplex
1873 establishments in Texas
Populated places established in 1873